Kertomichthys blastorhinos is a species of eel in the family Ophichthidae. It is the only member of its genus. It is found only in the Atlantic Ocean in the vicinity of French Guiana.

References

Ophichthidae
Fish described in 1963